Caroline Gathorne-Hardy, Countess of Cranbrook  (née Jarvis; 18 December 1935) is an English aristocrat and campaigner on food quality issues. She is the wife of Gathorne Gathorne-Hardy, 5th Earl of Cranbrook.

She was born in London in 1935, the daughter of Colonel Ralph George Edward Jarvis of Doddington Hall, Lincolnshire and his wife, Antonia Mary Hilda Meade. Both of her parents were in MI6, and she moved to Portugal as a girl.

She married the Earl of Cranbrook on 9 May 1967, and took up the married name Caroline Gathorne-Hardy. Their early home was in a jungle area of Malaya, where her husband worked as a zoologist. After three years, they took up residence at his family seat, Great Glemham House, Great Glemham, Saxmundham, Suffolk. She ran the estate farm and raised their three children. When her husband inherited the earldom of Cranbrook from his father, on 22 November 1978, she became a Countess.

She was made an Officer of the Order of the British Empire (OBE) in 2004, for services to the red meat industry, after campaigning to save local abattoirs. She is president of the Aldeburgh Food and Drink Festival.

Lady Cranbrook appeared as a castaway on the BBC Radio programme Desert Island Discs on 31 May 2009, and received The Oldie's 'Campaigner of the Year' Award in 2010. The Prince of Wales has called her "the doughtiest fighter for good sense in agriculture".

She and her husband have three children: 
John Jason Gathorne-Hardy, Lord Medway (born 26 October 1968), heir apparent to the Earldom, born in Kuala Lumpur
Dr. Lady Flora Gathorne-Hardy (born 10 October 1971)
Hon. Argus Edward Gathorne-Hardy (born 28 May 1973)

References 

1935 births
Living people
People from Lincolnshire
People from Suffolk Coastal (district)
British countesses
English farmers
British women farmers
Food activists
Officers of the Order of the British Empire
Gathorne-Hardy family